Tenagodus barbadensis is a species of sea snail, a marine gastropod mollusk in the family Siliquariidae.

Distribution
Barbados.

Description 
The maximum recorded shell length is 48.9 mm.

Habitat 
Minimum recorded depth is 101 m. Maximum recorded depth is 101 m.

It lives as an obligatory commensal on certain species of sponges from families Halichondriidae and Thrombidae.

References

Siliquariidae
Gastropods described in 2004